Eunice is a city in Acadia and St. Landry parishes in the U.S. state of Louisiana.  The 2010 census placed the population at 10,398, a decrease of 1,101, or 9.5 percent, from the 2000 tabulation of 11,499.

The St. Landry Parish portion of Eunice is part of the Opelousas–Eunice Micropolitan Statistical Area, while the Acadia Parish portion is part of the Crowley Micropolitan Statistical Area.

History

One-time lawman and pioneer land developer C.C. Duson is credited with founding Eunice, which was named for his second wife, Eunice Pharr Duson. He and his brother, W.W. Duson, had already founded Crowley, Louisiana in 1887, and now he looked to the north of the parish for future development. Duson bought  of land from Willie Humble of Prairie Faquetaïque and mapped out a town site, laid out in lots 50-by-140 feet, 12 lots to the block. Next, he persuaded the Southern Pacific Railroad to extend a branch line from Crowley to his new town. Then he began what he and his brother had learned how to do as well as anyone: promote land sales. It was chartered as a village on September 12, 1894, and incorporated as a town on June 4, 1895.

Evangeline Parish was created with the passage of a bill in June 1908. Eunice and Ville Platte were in competition for the parish seat, and Ville Platte was selected by voters on April 12, 1909. After the election, Eunice declared it would remain in St. Landry Parish.

In May 2000 a chemical freight train derailed in Eunice, spilling numerous hazardous chemicals and causing about 15 tank cars to explode and burn; approximately 3,500 residents of the town were evacuated for as many as five days. Over 10,000 residents settled in May 2004 for $65 million with the Union Pacific Corporation in a class action suit, claiming that the corporation had failed to repair a defective section of track.

Geography
According to the United States Census Bureau, the city has a total area of 4.7 square miles (12.1 km2), all land.

Louisiana Highway 13 and U.S. Highway 190 pass through the center of Eunice with U.S. 190 heading west  to Kinder and east  to Opelousas, the seat of St. Landry Parish. LA-13 heads north  to Mamou and south  to Crowley, the seat of Acadia Parish.

Climate
The climate in this area is characterized by hot, humid summers and generally mild to cool winters.  According to the Köppen Climate Classification system, Eunice has a humid subtropical climate, abbreviated "Cfa" on climate maps.

Parish
Eunice is in parts of three parishes, St. Landry, Acadia and Evangeline. Thus the names of certain businesses in Eunice, such as Tri-Parish Bank. Most of the Evangeline Parish portion of Eunice is unincorporated.

St. Landry
Most of the city limits are located in St. Landry parish. This was one of the original parishes in Louisiana.

Acadia Parish
Acadia to the south actually borders most of the southern city limits, in a close west to east parallel line, with Sittig Street in the center, parish road 7-23 to the east, and both just inside the St. Landry Parish. On the west side the city limits drops south following highway 755 south and includes the airport, the Louisiana State University Eunice campus, as well as the streets around the campus. Acadia Parish also succeeded from the parish of St. Landry.

Demographics

As of the 2020 United States census, there were 9,422 people, 3,642 households, and 2,470 families residing in the city. As of the 2010 United States Census, there were 10,398 people living in the city. The racial makeup of the city was 63.0% White, 32.5% Black, 0.3% Native American, 0.6% Asian, 0.2% from some other race and 1.2% from two or more races. 2.3% were Hispanic or Latino of any race.

As of the census of 2000, there were 11,499 people, 4,316 households, and 2,986 families living in the city. The racial makeup of the city was 68.76% White, 29.91% African American, 0.11% Native American, 0.21% Asian, 0.02% Pacific Islander, 0.34% from other races, and 0.65% from two or more races. Hispanic or Latino of any race were 1.11% of the population.

There were 4,316 households, out of which 34.8% had children under the age of 18 living with them, 47.0% were married couples living together, 17.5% had a female householder with no husband present, and 30.8% were non-families. 27.4% of all households were made up of individuals, and 12.3% had someone living alone who was 65 years of age or older. The average household size was 2.59 and the average family size was 3.18.

In the city, the population was spread out, with 29.6% under the age of 18, 10.0% from 18 to 24, 24.1% from 25 to 44, 20.8% from 45 to 64, and 15.5% who were 65 years of age or older. The median age was 35 years, a half year older than the statewide median age of 34.0 years.  For every 100 females, there were 89.0 males. For every 100 females age 18 and over, there were 82.5 males.

The median income for a household in the city was $21,372, and the median income for a family was $27,173. Males had a median income of $29,500 versus $18,912 for females. The per capita income for the city was $11,937. About 26.5% of families and 31.4% of the population were below the poverty line, including 41.9% of those under age 18 and 20.6% of those age 65 or over.

Arts and culture
Located near the heart of Cajun country, Eunice is famous for its Cajun music, and in November 1997 the Cajun Music Hall of Fame and Museum was founded there.
The City of Eunice and the National Park Service sponsor "Laissez les bons temps rouler au rendezvous des cajuns", a live Cajun music show every Saturday night at the Liberty Theatre, an old movie theater that was restored by a "coup de main" by local volunteers after falling into disrepair.

Eunice is home to the Prairie Acadian Cultural Center, a unit of Jean Lafitte National Historical Park and Preserve.

Eunice is host to one of the largest Courir de Mardi Gras (traditional rural French Louisiana Mardi Gras observance,) as well as the World Championship Crawfish Étouffée Cook-off.

In 2015, The Eunice Rotary Club and the Jean Lafitte National Park and Preserve teamed up to host a revitalized folklife festival known as the Experience Louisiana Festival held each October on the campus of LSU Eunice.

Education
Eunice is the home of Louisiana State University Eunice, a community college. LSUE is a campus of Louisiana State University.

Eunice is also home to both Eunice High School and St Edmund High School.

Notable people

 Geno Delafose, Zydeco musician
 Mary Alice Fontenot, author of "Clovis the Crawfish" series of books
 Kyries Hebert, American football free safety from the NFL's Cincinnati Bengals
 C.W. Lemoine, Author and Air Force aviator. 
 Carlton Loewer, Major League Baseball pitcher
 Dennis McGee, Cajun musician
 Keith Ortego,  American football wide receiver for the Super Bowl XX champion Chicago Bears
 Ann Savoy, Cajun accordionist
 Marc Savoy, Cajun accordionist and accordion maker
 Tharold Simon, NFL cornerback for the Seattle Seahawks
 Cora Kelley Ward, painter
 Jay Young, television news anchor

See also
Music of Louisiana
List of Notable People Related to Cajun Music

References

External links

City of Eunice
Eunice Chamber of Commerce

Cities in Louisiana
Cities in St. Landry Parish, Louisiana
Cities in Acadia Parish, Louisiana
Populated places established in 1894
Cities in Lafayette, Louisiana metropolitan area